Call Me Sylvia is the second album by rock and roll band Low Cut Connie, released on September 25, 2012. The band has described it as their first album recorded with the knowledge that they were really a band, whereas Get Out the Lotion, their debut album, was recorded under more informal circumstances. The song "Boozophilia" was released as a single from the album, accompanied by a music video which was filmed at Ray's Happy Birthday Bar in Philadelphia. In August 2015, "Boozophilia" was featured on Barack Obama's summer playlist.

Critical reception
Call Me Sylvia received generally favorable reviews from critics; according to Metacritic, which aggregates reviews by well-known critics, the album has a score of 80/100. It was described as "pathologically fun" by Stacey Anderson. Similarly, Ken Tucker wrote that the album was "as raucous as [Low Cut Connie's] debut, though it's a bit more self-conscious." Brent Wells wrote that Call Me Sylvia was "an exercise created by a pack of blue-collar dudes who relish throwback grooves and the art of clever sarcasm." "Boozophilia" was ranked as the 31st best song of 2012 by Rolling Stone, and was praised in Paste for its "rollicking piano lines, warm guitar shuffles, and shout-along vocals."

Track listing
 Say Yes 
 Boozophilia 
 Donʼt Cry Baby Blue 
 Desperation 
 Pity Party 
 Brand New Cadillac 
 Stay Alive If You Can
 Call Me Sylvia 
 Sister Mary 
 Cleveland 
 Youʼve Got Everything 
 Scoliosis In Secaucus 
 Share Your Name 
 (No More) Wet T-shirt Contests 
 Dreams Donʼt Come True

References

Low Cut Connie albums
2012 albums